The 1988 FA Cup final was the 107th final of the FA Cup. It took place on Saturday, 14 May 1988 at Wembley Stadium and was contested between Wimbledon and Liverpool, the dominant English club side of the 1980s and newly crowned league champions.

In one of the biggest shocks in the entire history of the competition, Lawrie Sanchez' solitary goal of the game won Wimbledon their only FA Cup final win in their history; they had just completed their second season in the Football League First Division and had only been in the Football League for a total of 11 years. The final also featured the first ever penalty save in an FA Cup final, by Dave Beasant from John Aldridge. Beasant is often mistakenly believed to have been the first goalkeeper to captain a winning side in an FA Cup Final but this honour falls to Major William Merriman of the Royal Engineers who captained his side to victory in 1875. It was the last FA Cup final to be broadcast live simultaneously by both the BBC and ITV until 2022 - this happened at every final since 1958. Wimbledon's victory ended Liverpool's bid to become the first team to win the Double twice, a feat that was eventually achieved by rivals Manchester United in 1996.  The game was the last that former England international Laurie Cunningham would play in England, before his death in Spain in 1989.

Road to Wembley

Liverpool

Wimbledon

Build-up
Liverpool had just been crowned once again as champions of Division One and were the all-conquering giants of English football throughout the 1980s. Wimbledon had just finished seventh in the Division One table that season, only their second year in the top tier, but had surprised everyone as they were expected to finish much lower than that. Liverpool, with a team full of international star players, were strongly expected and favoured to win the FA Cup by all the experts, as they had secured their 17th league title by playing in an exciting and flamboyant style, whereas Wimbledon, who had been playing in the semi-professional Southern Football League just eleven years earlier, were  derided by many pundits as being technically limited and dismissed as relying only on their strength, and were expected to have almost no chance of beating their illustrious opponents.

Match summary
Wimbledon took the lead shortly before half-time, when Lawrie Sanchez's looping header, from a Dennis Wise free kick on the left, went across goalkeeper Bruce Grobbelaar and into the net.
Liverpool created a host of chances, including a chipped goal over the goalkeeper by Peter Beardsley which was disallowed as the referee had already awarded a free kick to Liverpool, but were unable to find a way past Wimbledon goalkeeper Dave Beasant. The Merseysiders were awarded a penalty on the hour mark following a foul by Clive Goodyear on John Aldridge. However, Aldridge's penalty was saved by Beasant's diving save to his left, thus Beasant became the first keeper to save a penalty in a Wembley FA Cup final. The Londoners survived more pressure from Liverpool to secure their first major trophy and a notable upset in FA Cup Final history. Captain Dave Beasant became the second goalkeeper to lift the FA Cup as a result (Royal Engineers goalkeeper and captain Major William Merriman lifted the Cup in 1875). After the final whistle John Motson who was commentating for the BBC delivered his famous line: "The Crazy Gang have beaten the Culture Club."

Europe
Although they had won the Cup, Wimbledon were prevented from competing in the 1988–89 European Cup Winners' Cup the following season due to the ongoing ban on all English teams from European competitions, following the actions of a group of Liverpool supporters in the 1985 European Cup Final Heysel disaster. At the time of the final, it was hoped that the ban would be rescinded, but after a number of violent incidents involving English fans during the 1988 European Championships, the FA withdrew their application for readmission.

Match details

See also
 Crazy Gang

References

External links
Game facts  at soccerbase.com
LFC History Match Report

Final
1988
FA Cup Final 1988
FA Cup Final 1988
FA Cup Final
FA Cup Final